This was the first edition of the tournament.

Ivo Karlović won the title after defeating Jordan Thompson 7–6(7–3), 6–3 in the final.

Seeds

Draw

Finals

Top half

Bottom half

References
Main Draw
Qualifying Draw

Calgary National Bank Challenger - Singles